Kim Yong-dae (born 11 October 1979) is a South Korean former football goalkeeper who last played for Ulsan Hyundai. He is considered one of South Korea's best goalkeepers even to the point where he had been nicknamed by fans as "Yong Der Sar" in reference to former Dutch goalkeeper Edwin van der Sar of Manchester United and the Netherlands.

Club career
Kim was picked up by Busan IPark in 2002, a year after he graduated from Yonsei University. From there, he quickly spent three seasons in and out, from 2002 to 2005, amassing 85 appearances. His first trophy would soon come as Busan IPark would become the 2004 Korean FA Cup champions.

Seongnam Ilhwa Chunma acquired his services from Busan in 2006 where he spent another three years, from 2006 to 2009, but saw his play time reduced with a total of 53 appearances. Despite his appearances, in the first year of his club, he was able to become the 2006 K-League champions, and the K-League Cup runner-up. The following year saw him become the runner-up of the K-League and once more in the 2009 K-League.

As required by law, every male South Korea member must attend a mandatory two-year service. Kim was then transferred to the army club Gwangju Sangmu for two years, in 2008, in which he played for the club with 50 appearances.

After his military stint was finished, he moved to FC Seoul in 2010 where he would finally start getting more play time. That year, in 2010, he won the 2010 K-League, 2010 K-League Cup, and was selected as the best goalkeeper in the K-League via the 2010 K-League Best XI. In 2011, FC Seoul would come third in a close battle between the second and fourth positions sandwiched between Pohang Steelers and Suwon Bluewings.

In 2012, success would keep following Kim as he won the 2012 K-League and, once again, was voted as the best goalkeeper in the K-League via the 2012 K-League Best XI, as he was an integral part of FC Seoul.

The 2013 season saw a slight decline in Kim's goalkeeping abilities as he was benched for big games like the Super Match and 2014 Asian Champions League matches. However, his form would regain especially in vital knockout matches which saw him play well against Beijing Guoan.

On 31 July 2013, an in-form Kim Yong-dae put in a clear Man of the Match performance against Jeju United making many saves and to end it, saving a penalty in injury-time to deny Jeju United a draw and give FC Seoul the win.

Kim would continue his superb form with the club by making vital saves and helping them defeat Suwon Bluewings for the first time in three years in the K League Classic's Super Match as well as matches with Incheon United, Busan IPark and Daejeon Citizen.

On 21 August 2013, Kim brilliantly denied Brazilian Bruno César of Al-Alhi, during the start of the second half, from a free-kick spot from the middle of their half when he dove to save ball which many fans declared it as a "super save."

In the 2013 AFC Champions League Final, Kim played Guangzhou Evergrande of China in a two-legged affair ending 2–2 and 1–1. In both legs, Kim performed fantastic saves to keep his team level including a diving save from Dario Conca and a kick-save from Muriqui among others. Despite both legs being ties, Guangzhou Evergrande went on to win due to the away-goal rule thus leaving Kim and FC Seoul once again runners-up.

International career
Although he did not have a chance to play for South Korea in 2006 FIFA World Cup as he was pushed to Lee Woon-Jae, the number one goalkeeper in South Korea during the worldcup (even Lee was only able to play three times since Korea did not get through to the Round of 16), he was enlisted as the second [number two] goalkeeper for South Korea.

He was considered as the number two goalkeeper of South Korea currently and if he won the competition between Lee Woon-Jae and Kim Young-Kwang for the position of goalkeeper, he would be able to play in 2007 AFC Asian Cup, which will be taking place in July 2007. When the tournament rolled around, Kim was given the bench while the current, at the time, goalkeeper Lee Woon-Jae played all the matches.

In 2008, Kim saw his bargain for the top goalkeeper drop due to newcomer Jung Sung-Ryong taking over while Kim sat on the bench for many matches.

Two more years would go by after Kim would not be picked for a match until 2011 when he started on the bench against an Asian Cup match between Bahrain.

After another two years, in 2013, Kim was called up for the national team to sit on the bench against Qatar in a World Cup qualifying match, however would not see play time due to Jung Sung-Ryong, of Suwon Bluewings, currently being South Korea's main goalkeeper.

Club career statistics

International career statistics

International clean sheets
Results list South Korea's goal tally first.

Honours

Club
Busan I'Park
Korean FA Cup Winner: 2004

Seongnam Ilhwa Chunma
K League 1 Winner: 2006
K League 1 Runner-up: 2007, 2009
League Cup Runner-up: 2006

FC Seoul
K League 1 Winner: 2010, 2012
Korean FA Cup Winner: 2015
Korean FA Cup Runner-up: 2014
League Cup Winner: 2010
AFC Champions League Runner-up: 2013

International

 EAFF East Asian Cup (2): 2003, 2008

Individual
K League Best XI: 2010, 2012
AFC Champions League Dream Team: 2013

References

External links
 
 Kim Yong-dae – National Team Stats at KFA 
 
 

1979 births
Living people
Association football goalkeepers
South Korean footballers
South Korea international footballers
Busan IPark players
Seongnam FC players
Gimcheon Sangmu FC players
FC Seoul players
Ulsan Hyundai FC players
K League 1 players
2000 CONCACAF Gold Cup players
2000 AFC Asian Cup players
2001 FIFA Confederations Cup players
2004 AFC Asian Cup players
2006 FIFA World Cup players
2007 AFC Asian Cup players
2011 AFC Asian Cup players
Footballers at the 2000 Summer Olympics
Olympic footballers of South Korea
Sportspeople from South Gyeongsang Province
Yonsei University alumni
Asian Games medalists in football
Footballers at the 1998 Asian Games
Footballers at the 2002 Asian Games
Asian Games bronze medalists for South Korea
Medalists at the 2002 Asian Games